Swanee River is a 1939 American film directed by Sidney Lanfield and starring Don Ameche, Andrea Leeds, Al Jolson, and Felix Bressart. It is a biopic about Stephen Foster, a songwriter from Pittsburgh who falls in love with the South, marries a Southern girl, then is accused of sympathizing when the Civil War breaks out. Typical of 20th Century Fox biographical films of the time, the film was more fictional than it was factual.

Plot
The family of Stephen Foster (Ameche) insists that he accept a seven-dollar-a-week shipping clerk job in Cincinnati, but he prefers to write songs. Stephen's prospective father-in-law Andrew McDowell has no faith in Stephen, who wants to write "music from the heart of the simple people of the South." The struggling composer is content to sell "Oh! Susanna" for fifteen dollars to minstrel singer E. P. Christy and allows Christy to take credit as its writer.

Soon, the song is sweeping the country, and Stephen follows it with "De Camptown Races" and goes on tour with Christy's troupe, called Christy's Minstrels. Solvent at last, Stephen marries Jane McDowell (Leeds), and a daughter Marion is born to them. Inspired by his wife's beauty, Stephen writes "Jeanie with the Light Brown Hair."

However, Stephen's prosperity ends when his classical music fails and the advent of the Civil War brands his music as traitorous. When he turns to drinking, Jane leaves him, but two years later she returns to encourage him to write "Old Folks at Home." Stephen never hears the composition performed, however, for on the night that Christy presents the song to a New York audience, the composer dies of a heart attack.

Cast
 Don Ameche as Stephen Foster
 Andrea Leeds as Jane McDowell Foster
 Al Jolson as Edwin P. Christy
 Felix Bressart as Henry Kleber
 Chick Chandler as Bones
 Russell Hicks as Andrew McDowell
 George H. Reed as Old Joe, McDowell's Coachman
 Richard Clarke as Tom Harper
 Diane Fisher as Marion Foster
 George P. Breakston as Ambrose
 Al Herman as Tambo
 Charles Trowbridge as Mr. Foster
 George Meeker as Henry Foster
 Leona Roberts as Mrs. Foster
 Charles Tannen as Morrison Foster
 Clara Blandick as Mrs. Griffin
 Nella Walker as Mrs. McDowell
 Harry Hayden as Erwin
 Esther Dale as Temperance Woman
 Harry Tenbrook as Jim (uncredited)

Background
According to a news item in Hollywood Reporter, David O. Selznick was interested in working on this film. Material contained in the Twentieth Century-Fox Produced Scripts Collection at the UCLA Theater Arts Library adds that Richard Sherman worked on a treatment, but his participation in the final film has not been confirmed. In story conferences, Darryl F. Zanuck suggested Nancy Kelly for the role of Jane and Al Shean for Kleber. Twentieth Century-Fox publicity materials at the AMPAS Library note that some sequences were shot along the Sacramento River. Studio publicity also adds that Don Ameche learned to dance the soft shoe and play the violin for his role in this film. A news item in Hollywood Reporter adds that Andrea Leeds was borrowed from Samuel Goldwyn to make this picture.

There was an earlier screen biography of Foster only four years before this one. In 1935, Mascot Pictures produced a film on Foster's life entitled Harmony Lane, which was directed by Joseph Santley and starred Douglass Montgomery. Still another fictionalized biopic of Foster would be made in 1952. A B-picture entitled I Dream of Jeannie, it was released by Republic Pictures and starred Bill Shirley (Jeremy Brett's singing voice in My Fair Lady) as Foster.

In the film, Stephen Foster marries a girl from the South, but in real life, his wife was from Pittsburgh, as Foster was.  Additionally, Foster was not known as a Confederate sympathizer nor was he or his songs criticized for this aspect during his actual life, unlike the film.

The film's final scene is wholly inaccurate; there was no performance by E. P. Christy on the day Foster died. In reality, Christy died nearly two years before Foster; he committed suicide by throwing himself out of a window at his home in New York City, in May 1862. Foster himself died in January 1864.

Awards
Nominated for an Academy Award in the Music Scoring category.

References

Notes on Swanee River at the TCM database

External links

1939 films
1930s color films
1930s biographical drama films
20th Century Fox films
American biographical drama films
American black-and-white films
American Civil War films
Biographical films about musicians
Blackface minstrel shows and films
Films about composers
Films directed by Sidney Lanfield
Films produced by Darryl F. Zanuck
Films with screenplays by Philip Dunne
Cultural depictions of Stephen Foster
1930s historical films
American historical films
Films scored by Louis Silvers
1939 drama films
1930s English-language films
1930s American films